Yu Tian (born 18 February 1947), born Yu Tsing-yuan , is a Taiwanese pop singer in Mandarin and Hokkien. A member of the Democratic Progressive Party, Yu served as a member of the Legislative Yuan from 2008 to 2012, and was reelected to the office in 2019.

Education

Political career
Within the Democratic Progressive Party, Yu Tian is allied with Yu Shyi-kun. He is also known for his support of Chen Shui-bian. Yu ran for New Taipei 3 in 2008, and defeated Kuomintang incumbent Chu Chun-hsiao by approximately 2,000 votes. Chu filed an unsuccessful lawsuit in an attempt to annul the election results. A separate case was brought against Yu supporter Wang Ying-lan, who was charged with making threats to the opposition. Wang was later released on bail. In November 2008, Yu and other DPP politicians publicly protested Ma Ying-jeou's meeting with Association for Relations Across the Taiwan Strait Chairman Chen Yunlin. The next year, Yu's DPP membership was suspended because he had failed to fulfill a fundraising quota. In 2010, Yu was named to Tsai Ing-wen's New Taipei mayoral campaign team.

Though there was speculation that Yu would not receive DPP backing in a reelection bid, Yu was listed fourteenth on the Democratic Progressive Party's proportional representation party list, and expected to win. During the campaign, Kuomintang politicians accused Yu and others of gambling, and in response, Yu charged them with defamation.

The Taiwan Competitiveness Forum regarded Yu Tian as a controversial figure prior to the start of his first legislative term. During his first term, Yu was ranked highly by the Citizen Congress Watch.

In 2018, Yu was the only candidate to run in elections for the DPP chapter leadership in New Taipei. After Gao Jyh-peng was removed from office, Yu Tian was named the DPP candidate for by-elections held in March 2019. Yu won 56,888 votes, and defeated Kuomintang candidate  as well as independent Su Ching-yen. Yu took office on 21 March 2019. Yu was reelected to a full term in 2020.

Music career
Yu is best known for his 1977 release "Under the Banyan Tree", a Mandarin cover version of the Japanese song , and remained popular throughout the 1980s. In 2003, Yu founded the Taiwan Cultural Entertainment Development Association. Four years later, he launched a Kaohsiung-based entertainment labor union. Yu worked with Chthonic on the 2011 album Takasago Army and formally announced a return to the entertainment industry upon losing the 2012 legislative elections.

Personal life
Yu is married to fellow entertainer . His family was the target of extortion by the Bamboo Union in 2005.

Yu Tian's adopted younger brother was sentenced to death by Chinese authorities for attempting to smuggle heroin into the country in March 2005.

Yu Tian's second daughter, Yu Yuan-chi, died of rectal cancer at Taipei Veterans General Hospital on August 21, 2022, aged 39.

References

External links

1947 births
Living people
Taiwanese Hokkien pop singers
Taiwanese Mandopop singer-songwriters
Taiwanese actor-politicians
Taiwanese Protestants
Taiwanese people of Hoklo descent
Converts to Protestantism from Buddhism
Politicians of the Republic of China on Taiwan from Hsinchu
New Taipei Members of the Legislative Yuan
Members of the 7th Legislative Yuan
Democratic Progressive Party Members of the Legislative Yuan
Members of the 9th Legislative Yuan
Members of the 10th Legislative Yuan